Pauline Powell Burns (1872–1912) was an American painter and pianist. She was the first African-American artist to exhibit paintings in California in 1890. Powell was also a pianist who gave recitals around the San Francisco Bay Area.

Family history
Pauline Powell was born in 1872 in Oakland, California, to Josephine Turner and her husband, train porter William W. Powell. Her great-grandfather was blacksmith Joseph Fossett, one of Thomas Jefferson's slaves who was freed by the terms of his will in 1826. Her grandmother Isabella Fossett was also a slave and as a child was sold away from Monticello in 1827 as part of a settlement of estate debts, later escaping to Boston. Powell's parents moved to Oakland, where their daughter Pauline was born in 1872, the year her grandmother Isabella died.

On October 11, 1893, she married Edward E. Burns; they had no children.

Career
Powell showed early musical and artistic talent and studied both piano and painting. Although African-Americans were by then being admitted to the California School of Design, she appears to have been largely self-taught. She gave public piano recitals locally and at least once sang in a quartet in Los Angeles; she was praised by a Bay Area writer as “the bright musical star of her state.”

Powell is believed to have been the first African-American artist to exhibit anywhere in California. She apparently began showing her paintings at the age of 14, but her first known public exhibition was at the Mechanics' Institute Fair in San Francisco in 1890. Although her paintings at the fair received "great praise," she was then better recognized as a pianist and is listed in a 1919 history of African-Americans in California solely as a piano teacher.

Powell's artwork is scarce, partly because of when she lived but also because she died at  a young age. She died at the age of 40 in 1912, of tuberculosis. She is known to have painted landscapes and still lifes; surviving works include Champagne and Oysters (ca. 1890), Bulldogs, Still Life With Fruit (1890), Violets (oil on card, 1890), and a pair of watercolors, one of nasturtiums and the other of tulips, both of which are in the collection of Dunsmuir House in Oakland, California. Violets is in the collection of the Smithsonian Institution's National Museum of African American History and Culture.

Some documents relating to Powell's life are held in the Archives of California Art.

Public collections 
 National Museum of African American History and Culture, Washington DC

See also 
 List of African-American visual artists
 List of 20th-century women artists

References

1872 births
1912 deaths
19th-century American painters
20th-century American painters
19th-century American women artists
20th-century American women artists
19th-century American women pianists
19th-century American pianists
20th-century American women pianists
20th-century American pianists
African-American pianists
African-American women artists
American women painters
Painters from California
Pianists from San Francisco
Artists from Oakland, California
African-American painters
Hemings family
African-American women musicians
20th-century deaths from tuberculosis
Tuberculosis deaths in California